The RapidRide G Line is a future RapidRide bus service in Seattle, Washington, operated by King County Metro on Madison Street between Downtown Seattle and Madison Valley. The line is projected to open for service in 2024 and cost $133.4 million.

Route

The G Line will travel on Madison Street between Downtown Seattle and Madison Valley, an approximately  route.

The route begins near Colman Dock, the city's ferry terminal, at a station on 1st Avenue shared with the Seattle Streetcar. Within Downtown Seattle, buses will travel eastbound on Spring Street and westbound on Madison Street in transit lanes, stopping near the University Street light rail station at 3rd Avenue and the Seattle Central Library at 5th Avenue. The route crosses over Interstate 5 into First Hill, where the two directions merge after 9th Avenue onto Madison, continuing to run in center transit-only lanes. The G Line crosses Broadway, with a station connecting to the First Hill Streetcar, and passes the campus of Seattle University before transitioning to mixed traffic east of 15th Avenue. The route continues into Madison Valley, serving several curbside stations, before terminating at Martin Luther King Jr. Way near the Washington Park Arboretum.

Stops and stations

The G Line is planned to serve 21 total stops on its route, including 10 stops in each direction and the western terminal near Colman Dock.

Service

The G Line is planned to run 20 hours per day, with a headway of 6 minutes on weekdays and 15 minutes during weekends, and weekday mornings and evenings. Travel times from Downtown Seattle to Madison Valley are projected to improve from 16 minutes to 10 minutes with the G Line. The line is projected to carry 12,000 to 18,000 daily passengers.

Fleet

Plans to purchase new trolleybuses for this line were dropped in March 2019 after New Flyer Industries stated that the desired model would not be available in a single vehicle. Metro was unable to find another North American manufacturer willing to build articulated trolleybuses that could handle the very steep grades on the westernmost portion of the line (18–19%).

The buses are planned to have a total of five doors, three on the right and two on the left, for boarding at stations in the center and side of the roadway.

Funding

The G Line project is expected to cost $120 million, and will be funded by a mix of sources. Funding will be provided by a grant from the Federal Transit Administration (FTA), the 2015 Move Seattle levy, and the 2016 Sound Transit 3 ballot measure. The FTA awarded a $59.9 million Small Starts grant to the city government for the project in April 2021.

History

The Madison Street corridor was identified as a bus rapid transit candidate in the 2012 Transit Master Plan, adopted by the city of Seattle with input from King County Metro. While other routes were given feasibility studies for streetcars, as part of a new municipal system, Madison Street was considered too steep to support rail transit. The Madison Street corridor, from Downtown Seattle to Madison Park, was historically served by cable car service from 1890 until 1940, when they were scrapped and replaced with motor buses and trolleybuses on modern-day routes 11 and 12.

A design concept for the service was first presented for public comment in 2014, featuring two options for the eastern terminus, at 23rd Avenue or Martin Luther King Jr Way (MLK Way). A public survey was conducted and found higher support for the MLK Way terminus, as well as preferences for station locations and transfers to other transit routes. In February 2016, the Seattle City Council approved a locally preferred alternative for the project and endorsed it to pursue federal funding.

Residents of a condominium building on the line opposed the construction of a traction power substation that would be needed for the trolleybuses, citing possible health risks from exposure to electromagnetic fields.

As of 2017, construction on the project was planned to begin in mid-2018, with the line scheduled to open in 2019. However, it was later reported that uncertainty around federal funding was expected to delay construction. Reflecting those delays and following an FTA review, in March 2020 the projected opening date was pushed back to 2023. A further delay to 2024 and a budget increase to $133.4 million was announced in August 2020 due to an updated consultant review amid potential impacts of the COVID-19 pandemic.

A groundbreaking ceremony was held on September 30, 2021, with Federal Transit Administrator Nuria Fernandez in attendance. Construction on Madison Street began in October 2021.

References

External links
Project website

Bus transportation in Washington (state)
Transportation in Seattle
King County Metro